Ebeneser Þórarinsson (first name sometimes spelled Ebenezer) (27 August 1931 – 9 February 2003) was an Icelandic cross-country skier who competed in the 1950s. He finished 40th in the 18 km event at the 1952 Winter Olympics in Oslo.

References

External links
18 km Olympic cross country results: 1948-52
Ebenezer Thorarinsson's profile at Sports Reference.com

1931 births
2003 deaths
Cross-country skiers at the 1952 Winter Olympics
Ebenezer Thorarinsson
Ebenezer Thorarinsson
Ebenezer Thorarinsson
20th-century Icelandic people